Mad dog is a phrase commonly attributed to rabid dogs.

Due to the Welsh given name 'Madog' (derived from Prince Madoc), in English speaking countries, it is often mistaken for the words 'Mad dog'.

Mad Dog may also refer to:

Music
 Mad Dog (album), an album by John Entwistle
 "Mad Dog", a song by America from Holiday
 "Mad Dog", a song by Deep Purple from The House of Blue Light
 "Mad Dog", a song by Pentagram from Sub-Basement

People
 Johnny Adair (born 1963), Northern Irish loyalist paramilitary
 Martin Allen (born 1965), English footballer
 Brett Banasiewicz (born 1994), American professional BMX rider
 Mike Bell (wrestler) (1971–2008), American professional wrestler
 Roger Caron (1938–2012), Canadian robber 
 Mad Dog Coll (1908–1932), Irish-American gangster
 David C. Dolby (1946–2010), US Army Medal of Honor recipient
 Charles Gargotta (1900–1950), Italian-American gangster
 Jon Hall (programmer) (born 1950), American computer programmer
 Gene Hatcher (born 1959), American boxer 
 Leslie Irvin (serial killer) (1924–1983), 1950s American serial killer
 Bob Lassiter (1945–2006), American radio talk show host
 Pierre Lefebvre (1955–1985), French-Canadian professional wrestler
 Vini Lopez (born 1949), American drummer
 Adam MacDougall (born 1975), Australian rugby league player
 Jeff Madden, college football strength and conditioning coach
 Bill Madlock (born 1951), American baseball player
 Mark Madsen (basketball) (born 1976), American basketball coach and former player
 Jim Mandich (1948–2011), American football player
 Michel Martel (1944–1978), Canadian professional wrestler
 Jim Mattis (born 1950), American Marine Corps general and Secretary of Defense
 Brian McGlinchey (born 1977), Northern Ireland footballer
 Dominic McGlinchey (1954–1994), leader of the INLA
 Mad Dog McPhie (born 1971), English professional wrestler
 Lewis Moody (born 1978), English rugby union player
 Dan Morgan (bushranger) (1830–1865), Australian bushranger
 Robbie Muir (footballer) (born 1953), Australian rules footballer
 Mad Dog O'Malley, Irish-American professional wrestler
 Edgar Ross (boxer) (1949–2012), American boxer
 Chris Russo  (born 1959), American sports radio personality
 Joseph "Mad Dog" Taborsky (1924–1960), American executed murderer
 Michael Taccetta (born 1947), a member of the New Jersey Lucchese crime family
 Maurice Vachon (1929–2013), French-Canadian professional wrestler
 Dwight White (1949–2008), American football player
 Xu Xiaodong (born 1979), a Chinese mixed martial artist
 Wong Yuk-man (born 1951), Hong Kong politician

Fictional characters
 Mad Dog (comics), various characters
 Mad Dog (Marvel Comics), a villain
 Mad Dog Rassitano, a bounty hunter in the Marvel Universe
 Buford "Mad Dog" Tannen, from the film Back to the Future Part III
 Johnny Mad Dog, from the film of the same name by Jean-Stéphane Sauvaire
 Mad Dog, a character from manga and anime series Haikyu!!
 Mad Dog Branzillo, in the book A Swiftly Tilting Planet by Madeleine L'Engle
 Mad Dog, nickname of Wayne Dobie in the film Mad Dog and Glory
 Mad Dog, from the John Woo film Hard Boiled
 Mad Dog, from the film Ong Bak, starring Tony Jaa
 Mad Dog, from the film The Raid: Redemption, starring Iko Uwais
 the title character of Mad Dog Morgan, a 1976 Australian bushranger film
 Tommy "Mad Dog" McCulum, from the South African TV series Isidingo
 the title character of Mad Dog McCree, a 1990 laserdisc video game
 Mad Dog, a character in the Nintendo DS game Contra 4

Other uses
 Mad Dog (TV series), a 2017 South Korean television series
 Mad Dog Knives, a knifemaking company
 Mad Dog Oil Field, in the Gulf of Mexico
 "Mad Dog", an episode of the 1975 television series Survivors
 Mad Dog Inc., a group of Texas authors including Bud Shrake
 Maddog 20/20, a flavored fortified wine from Mogen David
 MadDog, the mascot of the Northeastern University Rugby Club
 McDonnell Douglas MD-80, a family of commercial jet liners, nicknamed Mad Dog

See also
 The mad dog of the Middle East, a phrase used by U.S. President Ronald Reagan to describe Libyan leader Muammar Gaddafi
 Wanderlei Silva (born 1976), Brazilian mixed martial artist nicknamed Cachorro Louco (Portuguese for "mad dog")
 Mad-dog skullcap (Scutellaria lateriflora), a plant 
 Mad Dog Coll (disambiguation)
 Mad Dogs (disambiguation)
 Mad Dogs and Englishmen (disambiguation)
 
 Goro Majima, known as the "Mad Dog of Shimano" in the Yakuza video game series
 Madd Dogg, a video game character in Grand Theft Auto: San Andreas
 Wściekły pies (English: mad dog), Polish cocktail

Lists of people by nickname